Bêba is a town in the west of Bayi District, Nyingchi, in the southeast of the Tibet Autonomous Region. It lies at an altitude of 3,231 metres (10,603 feet) along China National Highway 318 from Markam to Lhasa, between Bayi and Kongpo Gyamda. The Niyang River, a tributary of the Tsangpo, flows past the town.

See also
List of towns and villages in Tibet Autonomous Region

References

Populated places in Nyingchi